The 1976 winners of the Torneo di Viareggio (in English, the Viareggio Tournament, officially the Viareggio Cup World Football Tournament Coppa Carnevale), the annual youth football tournament held in Viareggio, Tuscany, are listed below.

Format

The 16 teams are seeded in 4 groups. Each team from a group meets the others in a single tie. The winner of each group progress to the final knockout stage.

Participating teams

Italian teams

  Como
  Inter Milan
  Lazio
  Milan
  Napoli
  Roma
  Sampdoria
  Torino

European teams

  Dukla Praha
  CSKA Sofia
  Barcelona
  Partizan Beograd
  Heemskerk
  Offenbach
  Rangers
  Wisła Kraków

Group stage

Group A

Group B

Group C

Group D

Knockout stage

Champions

Footnotes

External links
 Official Site (Italian)
 Results on RSSSF.com

1976
1975–76 in Italian football
1975–76 in Yugoslav football
1975–76 in Spanish football
1975–76 in Dutch football
1975–76 in Polish football
1975–76 in Scottish football
1975–76 in Bulgarian football
1975–76 in Czechoslovak football
1975–76 in German football